The Astra A-70 is a single-action locked breech semi-automatic pistol at one time produced in Spain by Astra-Unceta y Cia SA.
The Astra A-70 is a compact pistol designed for those that need more firepower than offered by the Astra Constable.  It has a weight of 31 oz, OAL of 6.5 inch, 4.75 inch in height and 1.5 inch wide with a 3.5 inch barrel. The Astra A-70 is an 8-shot, single action recoil operated semi-automatic with a right side only thumb safety. It has fixed combat sights.  The Astra A-70 uses three safeties: a firing pin safety that prevents the firing pin from engaging unless the trigger is deliberately pulled, a manual thumb safety, and a hammer safety.

References

External links
 User Manual

9mm Parabellum semi-automatic pistols
.40 S&W firearms
Semi-automatic pistols of Spain